George Angus Buckstaff (December 22, 1861September 26, 1927) was an American lawyer, businessman, and Republican politician.  He was the 43rd Speaker of the Wisconsin State Assembly.

Biography
George Buckstaff was born December 22, 1861, at Oshkosh, Wisconsin.  He attended the public schools at Oshkosh, and then attended the Wisconsin State University at Oshkosh from 1882 to 1885.  He graduated from Columbia Law School and the University of Wisconsin Law School in 1886.  He was admitted to the bar later that year and went to work for the Buckstaff-Edwards casket and furniture manufacturing company, which was partly owned by his father.  He was appointed secretary of the company and manager of the chair department.

In 1894, he was elected to the Wisconsin State Assembly from Winnebago County's 3rd Assembly district, which then comprised the southern half of the county.  A legislative redistricting plan was passed during the 1895–1896 session.  In the 1896 election, Buckstaff was elected to another term in the Assembly from the new Winnebago 1st Assembly district—then comprising just the city of Oshkosh.  At the start of the 1897 session, he was chosen as speaker of the Assembly with a bipartisan vote of 91 out of 100 members.

He chose not to run for re-election in 1898 and instead ran for Wisconsin State Senate, challenging incumbent Charles W. Davis for the Republican nomination.  At the Winnebago County convention in September, Buckstaff defeated Davis on the first ballot, taking 77 votes to Davis' 35.  In the general election, however, Buckstaff fell 133 votes short of his Democratic opponent, Henry I. Weed.

Buckstaff's became president of the Buckstaff Company after the death of his father in 1900.  He devoted most of the remainder of his career to the management of the company.

In his later years, he served on a number of appointed state commissions.  During World War I, he served on the Governor's council on defense and the liberty loan commission.  He also served on the state Fish & Game Commission and introduced the law to abolish net fishing in Lake Winnebago.  He also successfully lobbied the U.S. Army Corps of Engineers to take steps to control flooding at Lake Winnebago and the Fox and Wolf rivers.

Personal life and family
George Buckstaff was the son of Canadian American immigrant John Buckstaff, Jr.  John Buckstaff and his brothers were prominent lumbermen and pioneers in the Oshkosh area before going into the shingle and furniture manufacturing business.  George Angus Buckstaff's uncle George H. Buckstaff also served in the Wisconsin State Assembly and State Senate.

Electoral history

Wisconsin Assembly (1894, 1896)

| colspan="6" style="text-align:center;background-color: #e9e9e9;"| General Election, November 6, 1894

| colspan="6" style="text-align:center;background-color: #e9e9e9;"| General Election, November 3, 1896

Wisconsin Senate (1898)

| colspan="6" style="text-align:center;background-color: #e9e9e9;"| General Election, November 8, 1898

References

External links

1861 births
1927 deaths
Politicians from Oshkosh, Wisconsin
Businesspeople from Wisconsin
Speakers of the Wisconsin State Assembly
Republican Party members of the Wisconsin State Assembly